Norris Jones, better known as Sirone (September 28, 1940 – October 21, 2009) was an American jazz bassist, trombonist, and composer.

Biography
Born in Atlanta, Georgia, Sirone worked in Atlanta late in the 1950s and early in the 1960s with "The Group" alongside George Adams; he also recorded with R&B musicians such as Sam Cooke and Smokey Robinson. In 1966, in response to a call from Marion Brown, he moved to New York City, where he co-founded the "Untraditional Jazz Improvisational Team" with Dave Burrell. He also worked with Brown, Gato Barbieri, Pharoah Sanders, Noah Howard, Sonny Sharrock, Sunny Murray, Albert Ayler, Archie Shepp, and Sun Ra, as well as with John Coltrane when he was near the end of his career.

He co-founded the Revolutionary Ensemble with Leroy Jenkins and Frank Clayton in 1971; Jerome Cooper later replaced Clayton in the ensemble, which was active for much of the decade. In the 1970s and early 1980s Sirone recorded with Clifford Thornton, Roswell Rudd, Dewey Redman, Cecil Taylor, and Walt Dickerson.

In the 1980s, he was member of Phalanx, a group with guitarist James "Blood" Ulmer, drummer Rashied Ali, and tenor saxophonist George Adams.

From 1989, he lived in Berlin, Germany, where he was active with his group 'Concord' (with Ben Abarbanel-Wolff and Ulli Bartel.) He was involved in theater, film, and was a practicing Buddhist.

He died on October 21, 2009, at the age of 69.

Discography

As leader or co-leader
1979: Artistry (Of The Cosmos) with James Newton, Don Moye, Muneer Bernard Fennell
 1982: Life Rays (Soul Note)  with Walt Dickerson/Andrew Cyrille 2003: Sirone's Concord (Not Two Records)
 2005: Live (Atavistic Records)
 2005: Configuration (Silkheart Records) with Billy BangWith the Revolutionary Ensemble 1972: Vietnam (ESP-Disk)
 1972: Manhattan Cycles (India Navigation)
 1975: The Psyche (RE Records)
 1976: The Peoples Republic (A&M/Horizon)
 1977: Revolutionary Ensemble (Enja)
 2004: And Now... (Pi Recordings)
 2008: Beyond the Boundary of Time (Mutable)
 2012: Counterparts (Mutable)With Sabir Mateen and Andrew Barker 2013: Infinite Flowers (Sagittarius A-Star)With Oluyemi Thomas and Michael Wimberly 2010: Beneath Tones Floor (NoBusiness Records)

As sidemanWith George Adams 1989: Nightingale (Blue Note)With The All Ear Trio (John Tchicai, Thomas Agergaard, and Peter Ole Jorgensen) 2008: Boiler (Ninth World Music)With Albert Ayler 2004: Holy Ghost: Rare & Unissued Recordings (1962–70) (Revenant)With Billy Bang 1988: Valve No. 10 (Soul Note)With Gato Barbieri 1967: In Search of the Mystery (ESP-Disk)With Dane Belany 1975: Motivations (Sahara Records)With Marion Brown 1967: Three for Shepp (Impulse!)
 1968: Why Not? (ESP-Disk)With Dave Burrell 1968: High Won-High Two (Black Lion)With Zusaan  2004: Making Waves (Flying Note)With Charles Gayle 1988: Always Born (Silkheart)
 1988: Homeless (Silkheart)
 1988: Spirits Before (Silkheart)
 2003: Shout! (Cleanfeed)With The Group (Ahmed Abdullah, Marion Brown, Billy Bang, Sirone, Fred Hopkins, Andrew Cyrille)
 Live (NoBusiness Records, 2012)With Noah Howard 1966: At Judson Hall (ESP-Disk)
 1969: The Black Ark (Freedom)With The Jazz Composer's Orchestra 1973: Numatik Swing Band (JCOA)
 1975: For Players Only with Leroy Jenkins (JCOA)with the William Parker Bass Quartet 2006: Requiem (Splasc(H)) – with Charles GayleWith Phalanx 1987: Original Phalanx (DIW Records)
 1988: In Touch (DIW Records)With Dewey Redman 1973: The Ear of the Behearer (Impulse!)
 1974: Coincide (Impulse!)With Pharoah Sanders 1969: Izipho Zam (My Gifts) (Strata-East)With Sonny Sharrock 1969: Black Woman (Vortex)With Cecil Taylor 1974: Spring of Two Blue J's (Unit Core)
 1978: One Too Many Salty Swift and Not Goodbye (hat Hut)
 1978: Live in the Black Forest (MPS)
 1978: 3 Phasis (New World)
 1978: Cecil Taylor Unit (New World)
 1993: Always a Pleasure (FMP)
 2022: The Complete, Legendary, Live Return Concert (Oblivion)With Clifford Thornton 1972: Communications Network (Third World)With Guerino Mazzola' 2009: Liquid Bridges (Springer)

Filmography
 2008: Teak Leaves at The Temple'' by Garin Nugroho

References

External links
Discography of Sirone recordings

American jazz double-bassists
Male double-bassists
American jazz composers
American male jazz composers
Musicians from Atlanta
1940 births
2009 deaths
Free jazz double-bassists
Avant-garde jazz double-bassists
20th-century American composers
20th-century double-bassists
20th-century American male musicians
Revolutionary Ensemble members
Phalanx (band) members
20th-century jazz composers
African-American jazz musicians
20th-century African-American musicians
21st-century African-American people
NoBusiness Records artists